Henri Laaksonen was the defending champion but lost in the second round to Filip Peliwo.

Tim Smyczek won the title after defeating Bjorn Fratangelo 6–2, 6–4 in the final.

Seeds

Draw

Finals

Top half

Bottom half

References
Main Draw
Qualifying Draw

JSM Challenger of Champaign-Urbana - Singles
2017 Singles